Isocoma, commonly called jimmyweed or goldenweed, is a genus of North American semi-woody shrubs in the family Asteraceae. It is found in the semi-arid areas of Southwestern United States and Mexico.

The name of this genus is derived from the Greek for "equal hair" referring to the pappus on the seed.

Isocoma species are used as food plants by the larvae of some Lepidoptera species including Schinia bicuspida (recorded on I. drummondii), Schinia erosa (feeds exclusively on I. acradenia) and Schinia tertia (recorded on I. pluriflora).

 Species
 Isocoma acradenia (Greene) Greene - alkali goldenbush, alkali jimmyweed - Baja California, Sonora, California Arizona Nevada Utah
 Isocoma arguta Greene - Carquinez goldenbush - Solano County in California
 Isocoma azteca G.L.Nesom - Aztec goldenbush - Arizona New Mexico 
 Isocoma coronopifolia (Gray) Greene - common goldenbush, goldenweed - southern Texas, Coahuila, Nuevo León, Tamaulipas
 Isocoma drummondii (Torr. & Gray) Greene - Drummond's goldenbush, Drummond's jimmyweed - southern Texas, Tamaulipas
 Isocoma felgeri G.L.Nesom - Sonora
 Isocoma gypsophila B.L.Turner - Zacatecas, Nuevo León
 Isocoma hartwegii (A.Gray) Greene - San Luis Potosí, Zacatecas, Guanajuato
 Isocoma humilis G.L.Nesom - Zion goldenbush - Utah (Kane + Washington Cos)
 Isocoma menziesii (Hook. & Arn.) G.L.Nesom - Menzies' goldenbush - Baja California, California
 Isocoma pluriflora (Torr. & Gray) Greene - rayless goldenrod, southern goldenbush, southern jimmyweed - Texas New Mexico Arizona Chihuahua
 Isocoma rusbyi Greene - Rusby's goldenbush - Arizona New Mexico Utah Colorado
 Isocoma tehuacana G.L.Nesom - Puebla
 Isocoma tenuisecta Greene - burrow goldenweed, burroweed - Arizona New Mexico 
 Isocoma tomentosa G.L.Nesom - Chihuahua
 Isocoma veneta (Kunth) Greene - jimmyweed - Mexico from Coahuila to Oaxaca

References

External links
 
 
 USDA Plants Profile for Isocoma (goldenbush)
 Integrated Taxonomic Information System
 Jepson Manual

 
Asteraceae genera
Taxa named by Thomas Nuttall